Marguerite Gay Buist (born 29 December 1962) is a New Zealand long-distance runner. She competed in the women's marathon at the 1992 Summer Olympics.

In 1990, Buist was awarded the New Zealand 1990 Commemoration Medal.

References

External links
 

1962 births
Living people
Athletes (track and field) at the 1992 Summer Olympics
New Zealand female long-distance runners
New Zealand female marathon runners
Olympic athletes of New Zealand
Sportspeople from Whanganui